Krishnarao Dhulap  (21 December 1920 – 14 February 1989)  was a leader of Peasants and Workers Party of India. He was a member of Maharashtra Legislative Assembly and served as leader of the opposition from 1962 to 1972. Dhulap was a member of Rajya Sabha from 1974 to 1980.

References

1922 births
1989 deaths
Peasants and Workers Party of India politicians
Leaders of the Opposition in the Maharashtra Legislative Assembly
Maharashtra MLAs 1962–1967
Rajya Sabha members from Maharashtra
Maharashtra MLAs 1967–1972